The Balinačka River ( / Balinačka reka, "Balinac River") is a tributary of the Žukovačka River in Serbia. The village Balinac lies at the source of the river. It continues through Staro Korito and Kandalica and joins the Žukovačka River in Žukovac.

References

Rivers of Serbia
Timok Valley